This is a list of significant car races that have been held at the Mount Panorama Circuit near Bathurst, New South Wales, Australia. As Australia's most famous motor racing circuit, Mount Panorama has had a significant influence on the history and industry of Australian motor racing. Various major motorcycle races have also been held at the circuit.

Major car races

References

Motorsport in Bathurst, New South Wales